The Strada statale 115 Sud Occidentale Sicula (SS115),  is one of the major roads in Sicily, Italy. It is the major state highway running along the south coast and connects the towns of Trapani and Syracuse via Agrigento and Ragusa. It is 383 km long.
It is a part of the E45 and E931 European routes.

Major cities on route
 Trapani
 Marsala
 Mazara del Vallo
 Castelvetrano
 Sciacca
 Agrigento
 Licata
 Gela
 Vittoria
 Comiso
 Ragusa
 Modica
 Rosolini
 Noto
 Avola
 Syracuse

Transport in Sicily
115